1981 World Rhythmic Gymnastics Championships were held in Munich, West Germany on October 17 – 20th 1981.

Participants
The following countries sent competitor(s) Australia, Austria, Belgium, Brazil, Bulgaria, Canada, China, Cuba, Czechoslovakia, Denmark, East Germany, France, Great Britain, Hungary, Israel, Italy, Japan, Mexico, Netherlands, New Zealand, Norway, Poland, Portugal, Romania, Spain, Sweden, Switzerland, USA, USSR, West Germany & Yugoslavia

Individual

Groups
Countries who participated in the group competition are as follows.

Medal table

Individual Final

Individual All-Around

Individual Rope

Individual Hoop

Individual Clubs

Individual Ribbon

Group

Preliminaries

Finals

References
RSG.net

External links
FIG, the International Governing Body for Rhythmic Gymnastics

Rhythmic Gymnastics World Championships
Rhythmic
Rhythmic Gymnastics Championships
1981 in West German sport
October 1981 sports events in Europe